"Goodies in the Nick" (also known as "The Great Goodies Bank Robbery" and "Bank Robbery") is an episode of the British comedy television series The Goodies. Written by The Goodies, with songs and music by Bill Oddie.

Plot
The Goodies are asked by a cowardly Police Sergeant to help him gain a promotion.  Tim, Graeme and Bill decide to commit a crime so that the Police Sergeant can catch them and earn his promotion that way.

They turn up at a bank, dressed as gangsters and carrying violin cases, and hold up the bank.  When they ask for the safe to be opened, they are told that there is no money being kept there — so they ask for a cheque to the value of money which was usually kept in the safe.  Grabbing the cheque, they escape from the bank, inviting the Police Sergeant to capture them.  Shuffling away from the bank, they are closely pursued by several incompetent members of the police force, who are riding bicycles.

Months later, the Police Sergeant arrives at the Goodies' office, and discovers stolen paintings and other valuable items which had been taken in a series of robberies.  Tim has also been transformed into a Goodyfather during the intervening months, and nobody is allowed to call him "Tim" anymore — not even Bill or Graeme. The Police Sergeant was shocked and ridiculed by the trio but have them arrested for not having a dog license — even though the Goodies don't possess a dog.

The Goodies are put into prison for their crimes, although the only witness recognizes Graeme and Tim, but not Bill (the sergeant states that "two out of three's good enough").  After three years, they find that some truly surprising people had previously occupied their cell.  They also discover a way out of their cell, and use the large and heavy basketball-sized balls which are attached to their leg irons in ingenious and inventive ways to gain freedom from the prison, and then to escape detection when the police search for them as escaped prisoners.

The Goodies are eventually recaptured, and the Police Sergeant has been promoted as head of MI5 for solving the Goodies crimes. The Goodies go to trial — with Tim conducting their own defence, Graeme conducts the prosecution, and Bill takes over as judge. The Goodies turn the tables with a "total unprejudiced jury", with Graeme withdrawing the prosecution's case, and Tim recommending the Police Sergeant should be sufficiently punished by "having his botty soundly smacked and having his pips torn off". The Police Sergeant apologises but Bill gives him and the whole of MI5 life sentences, having gone mad with power as judge, and adds life sentences for everyone in the courthouse.

Notes
Goodies in the Nick is the last appearance of Tim's traditional three-piece navy blue suit from series one. Tim's new Goodies costume, a navy blue suit and Union Jack waistcoat, would debut in the series five opener.
 This episode spoofs the film The Godfather, with Tim as the Goodyfather.
 The episode also spoofs the Keystone Kops

References

 "The Complete Goodies" — Robert Ross, B T Batsford, London, 2000
 "The Goodies Rule OK" — Robert Ross, Carlton Books Ltd, Sydney, 2006
 "From Fringe to Flying Circus — 'Celebrating a Unique Generation of Comedy 1960-1980'" — Roger Wilmut, Eyre Methuen Ltd, 1980
 "The Goodies Episode Summaries" — Brett Allender
 "The Goodies — Fact File" — Matthew K. Sharp

External links
 

The Goodies (series 4) episodes
1974 British television episodes